Brazilian Confederation of In Line Hockey is the Brazilian national Inline hockey federation. It controls the Brazilian national inline hockey team.

References

Inline